Buse Ünal (born 29 July 1997) is a Turkish women's volleyball player. Currently, she plays for Fenerbahçe. She is a member of the Turkey women's national volleyball team.

Early life 
Buse Ünal was born into a family of athletes in Ankara, Turkey on 29 July 1997. Her father was a footballer and her mother a volleyball player, while her younger sister plays also volleyball. She completed primary and secondary school in Izmir and continued with her high school education in Ankara.

Playing career

Club 
Ünal started playing volleyball in the youth development team of Arkas Spor in Izmir, where she was a member for seven years during her school years. When the family resettled in Ankara, she joined the cadet team of Ilbank Ankara, where she played two years long. In 2013, her team took home the champion title of the Turkish cadet girls' championship. In the 2014–15 season, she was admitted to the senior team of Ilbank Ankara, which played then in the First League. After her team's relegation to the Second League, they were promoted to the First League at the end of the 2016–17 season.

After four seasons, Ünal left Ilbank Ankara, which was about to relegate again losing all of the twelve league matches in the mid of the 2017–18 First league. In January 2018, she signed with the successful Second League club Manisa Büyükşehir Belediyesi, which had chances to get promoted to the First League in the upcoming season.

She participated at the 2014–15 CEV Women's Challenge Cup with her team Ilbank Ankara.

{| class="wikitable"
|-
! Club
! From
! To
|-
|  Ilbank Ankara
|2014–2015
|2017–2018
|-
|  Manisa BBSK
|2017–2018
| –

International 
In March 2018, Ünal was admitted to the Turkey women's national volleyball team. She played in the 2018 FIVB Volleyball Women's Nations League for Turkey.

References 

Living people
1997 births
Sportspeople from Ankara
Turkish women's volleyball players
İller Bankası volleyballers
Turkey women's international volleyball players
Competitors at the 2018 Mediterranean Games
Mediterranean Games bronze medalists for Turkey
Mediterranean Games medalists in volleyball